Umapur is a village in the Basavakalyan taluk of Bidar district in the Indian state of Karnataka.

Demographics
Per the 2011 Census of India, Umapur has a total population of 1148; of whom 593 are male and 555 female.

Uma Maheshwara Temple
Umapur is famous for the ancient 12th century Uma Maheshwara Temple, built during the chalukyan reign located in the village.

Transport 
Umapur is 16 km from Taluka headquarter Basavakalyan. It is well connected by road to Basavakalyan. Nearest major railway station is in Bidar.

See also
Aurad
Basavakalyan
Humnabad
Bidar

References

External links
http://bidar.nic.in/

Villages in Bidar district
Western Chalukya Empire
Chalukya dynasty